Kaleem Sana (born 1 January 1994) is a Pakistan-born Canadian cricketer, who plays as fast bowler for Canada cricket team. He made his first-class debut for the Pakistan Customs in the 2008–09 Quaid-e-Azam Trophy on 9 January 2009. He made his List A debut for Rawalpindi Rams in the 2011–12 National One Day Championship on 12 March 2012.

In October 2021, he was named in Canada's Twenty20 International (T20I) squad for the 2021 ICC Men's T20 World Cup Americas Qualifier tournament in Antigua. In February 2022, he was named in Canada's T20I squad for the 2022 ICC Men's T20 World Cup Global Qualifier A tournament in Oman. He made his T20I debut on 18 February 2022, for Canada against the Philippines.

References

External links
 

1994 births
Living people
Pakistani cricketers
Canadian cricketers
Canada Twenty20 International cricketers
Rawalpindi cricketers